Broderipia nitidissima is a species of sea snail, a marine gastropod mollusk in the family Trochidae, the top snails.

Distribution
The height of the shell attains 3 mm, its diameter 9 mm. The shell is patella-shaped, ovate-oblong and symmetrical. The apex is subcentral. The shell is radiately ribbed. The ribs are strong, convex, simple, whitish. The interstices are irregularly marbled with brown. The interior is vividly pearly, with a rather large central spot of dull white notched in front, and bounded by the whitish muscle-impression. The rest of the inside has a nacre of unequaled brilliancy with opalescent reflections.

Distribution
This species occurs in the Indian Ocean off Réunion.

References

 Deshayes, G. P., 1863 Catalogue des mollusques de l'ile de la Réunion (Bourbon). Annexe E, in: Maillard, L. Notes sur l'isle de La Réunion, p. 1-4, 1-144

External links
 To Biodiversity Heritage Library (6 publications)
 To World Register of Marine Species

nitidissima
Gastropods described in 1863